Jack Giarraputo is an American film producer who co-founded Happy Madison Productions with Adam Sandler. He has been involved in the creation of more than 30 films in a little over a decade,  generating approximately $4 billion at the box office. Jack is one of the top 25 highest grossing producers in US Box office history, and the highest grossing producer for movies exclusively in the comedy genre.  Most of his work has been in films starring Sandler, a class-mate from NYU. He has produced movies at Disney, Paramount, Sony, Fox, and Warner Brothers. Jack is the founder of UrLife Media and is also an active venture capital investor, whose investments include various Hollywood Creative Agencies, Scientist.com and greenfence among others.

Film career
Along with partner Adam Sandler, he built Happy Madison into one of the most financially successful production companies in Hollywood, with 14 different movies surpassing the $100 million mark. The films include The Waterboy, Happy Gilmore, Billy Madison, The Wedding Singer, and The Longest Yard, amongst others.

In 2016, Giarraputo retired from day to day film production after producing the Sandler comedy Blended, and the Chris Columbus- directed Pixels, stating that he wants to focus more on raising his family.

Personal life
Jack graduated with a bachelor's degree from the Stern School of Business at NYU, and completed his JD from Fordham Law School. Through the Unstoppable Foundation, he is active in the charity space, helping young girls get access to education in Kenya. He also makes videos, (through his company UrLife), which support numerous other charities in raising capital.

Filmography
Happy Gilmore
Billy Madison
The Waterboy
50 First Dates
Eight Crazy Nights
Mr. Deeds
Little Nicky 
Dickie Roberts: Former Child Star
Deuce Bigalow: European Gigolo
Click
The Benchwarmers
Heavyweights
Strange Wilderness
Big Daddy 
I Now Pronounce You Chuck and Larry 
Bedtime Stories
Funny People
Rules of Engagement (2007 - 2013 television series)
Breaking In (2011 television series)
The Goldbergs (2013 television series)
Imaginary Mary (2017 television series)
Schooled (2019 television series)
That's My Boy
Just Go with It
Bucky Larson: Born to Be a Star
Grown Ups
Grown Ups 2
Blended

References

American film producers
Living people
Year of birth missing (living people)